The Slippery When Wet Tour, by American hard rock band Bon Jovi, ran from 1986 to 1987. It supported the band's multi-platinum 1986 album Slippery When Wet and was their first major worldwide tour, visiting places such as Australia and Canada for the first time.

"I remember reading about how The Beatles stopped playing live, because everyone just screamed though all the shows", noted Jon Bon Jovi. "Musicianship and song quality meant so little to the fans that the band just felt undervalued. You know what? I understand what they mean. It got so bad when we toured for Slippery When Wet that there were times I was freaking out… We indulged in everything that was on offer. But it wasn't real, and what I wanted above all else was to be given credit for the work I put into the songs and into the recording… The problem was that I didn't notice how the image overtook what we were about."

Of the omission of recordings from this tour from One Wild Night Live 1985–2001, Jon Bon Jovi remarked: "It makes sense for the Slippery tour not to be represented, because at that time I was dosed up on cortisone and my voice was shot. Back then, it wasn't much of a voice."

Accompanying acts
Cinderella supported at the majority of shows on the North American leg of the tour. In mainland Europe, Queensrÿche was the support. For the UK leg, support came from the British band FM on all dates except for the last two for which Queensrÿche was the support act. Other opening bands on this tour were Twisted Sister, The Smithereens, Keel and Winger, while The Choirboys were the direct support act for the Australian leg.

Judas Priest headlined the first leg in Canada and .38 Special headlined the second North American leg. "We were in Sioux Falls, South Dakota, when we found out that the album made number one in America…" Jon Bon Jovi recalled. "Bon Jovi were selling a million records a month and it was phenomenal. .38 Special's manager said, 'Maybe we'll let you be co-headliners.' We went, 'Great. Gotta go now. It's our time."

The tour also took the band to the Monsters of Rock 1986 in Germany with Warlock, Michael Schenker Group, Def Leppard, Ozzy Osbourne and headliners Scorpions. Bon Jovi, as a headliner this time, played at Monsters of Rock again in 1987 in England, along with Dio, Metallica, Anthrax, W.A.S.P. and Cinderella.

Setlist
The setlist of the tour varied between shows and countries. An average of 16 to 18 songs were played at each show. This is a set list from the show at Kemper Arena, Kansas City, Missouri, United States which was also popular throughout the Tour:

"Pink Flamingos"
"Raise Your Hands"
"Breakout"
"I'd Die for You"
"Tokyo Road"
"You Give Love a Bad Name"
"Wild in the Streets"
"Silent Night"
"Livin' on a Prayer"
"Let it Rock"
Guitar solo
Drum solo
"In and Out of Love"
"Runaway"
"Wanted Dead or Alive"
"Drift Away"  
"Get Ready"

Tour dates

Personnel
Jon Bon Jovi – lead vocals, guitar
Richie Sambora – guitar, backing vocals, talkbox
Alec John Such – bass, backing vocals
Tico Torres – drums, percussion
David Bryan – keyboards, piano, backing vocals

References

Bon Jovi concert tours
1986 concert tours
1987 concert tours